Roman I. Kotov is a clinical psychologist and professor in the Renaissance School of Medicine at Stony Brook University. His research focuses on the classification of mental disorders.

References

External links
Faculty page

Living people
Clinical psychologists
Ohio State University alumni
University of Iowa alumni
Stony Brook University faculty
21st-century psychologists
Year of birth missing (living people)